Advice (noun) or advise (verb) may refer to:
 Advice (opinion), an opinion or recommendation offered as a guide to action, conduct
 Advice (constitutional law) a frequently binding instruction issued to a constitutional office-holder
 Advice (programming), a piece of code executed when a join point is reached
 Advice (complexity), in complexity theory, a string with extra information used by Turing machine or other computing device
 Pay advice, also known as a pay slip
 , various Royal Navy ships
 "Advice" (song), a 2018 song by Cadet and Deno Driz
 "Advice" (song), the debut single by Christina Grimmie
 "Advice", a song by Kehlani from her album SweetSexySavage
 "Advice", a song by Cavetown
 ADVISE (Analysis, Dissemination, Visualization, Insight, and Semantic Enhancement), a research and development program within the US Department of Homeland Security
 The Advice, an American Contemporary Christian band
 The Advice (album), the band's 2013 debut album

See also
 
 
 
 
 Advisor
 Advocate